The LaBranche Wetlands Bridge is a concrete trestle bridge in the U.S. state of Louisiana. With a total length of 7,902 m or 25,925 ft, it is one of the longest bridges in the world. The bridge carries Interstate 310 over the LaBranche Wetlands in St. Charles Parish. The bridge opened in 1992.

The LaBranche Wetlands Bridge was constructed using a method known as "end-on construction" to avoid damaging the environmentally sensitive LaBranche Wetlands. This is a top-down technique in which construction platforms are mounted on concrete piles to avoid disrupting the environment below. From these platforms, the next set of piles and bridge viaducts are placed, allowing the platform to progress forward for the next set. The bridge won the 1992 Build America award in the Highway Division category.

See also
List of bridges in the United States
List of longest bridges in the world

References

External links
LA DOTD website

Bridges completed in 1992
Buildings and structures in St. Charles Parish, Louisiana
Tourist attractions in St. Charles Parish, Louisiana
Transportation in St. Charles Parish, Louisiana
Road bridges in Louisiana
3
Bridges on the Interstate Highway System
Concrete bridges in the United States
Trestle bridges in the United States